Hobgood is a town in Halifax County, North Carolina, United States. As of the 2010 census, the town had a total population of 348. It is part of the Roanoke Rapids, North Carolina Micropolitan Statistical Area.

Geography
Hobgood is located at  (36.026767, -77.398195).

Demographics

As of the census of 2000, there were 404 people, 165 households, and 117 families residing in the town. The population density was 392.4 people per square mile (151.4/km2). There were 202 housing units at an average density of 196.2 per square mile (75.7/km2). The racial makeup of the town was 47.77% White and 52.23% African American. Hispanic or Latino of any race were 0.74% of the population.

There were 165 households, out of which 27.9% had children under the age of 18 living with them, 41.8% were married couples living together, 27.3% had a female householder with no husband present, and 28.5% were non-families. 26.1% of all households were made up of individuals, and 13.9% had someone living alone who was 65 years of age or older. The average household size was 2.45 and the average family size was 2.96.

In the town, the population was spread out, with 27.0% under the age of 18, 6.4% from 18 to 24, 23.5% from 25 to 44, 25.7% from 45 to 64, and 17.3% who were 65 years of age or older. The median age was 38 years. For every 100 females, there were 86.2 males. For every 100 females age 18 and over, there were 79.9 males.

The median income for a household in the town was $24,107, and the median income for a family was $31,500. Males had a median income of $25,625 versus $25,000 for females. The per capita income for the town was $16,622. About 19.4% of families and 24.9% of the population were below the poverty line, including 31.3% of those under age 18 and 23.5% of those age 65 or over.

Notable person
Folk singer Tom Winslow was born in Hobgood.

References

External links
 Official website

Towns in Halifax County, North Carolina
Towns in North Carolina
Roanoke Rapids, North Carolina micropolitan area